Caporale is a surname. Notable people with the surname:

 Corky Caporale, Sopranos character played by Edoardo Ballerini
 Geraldo Scarpone Caporale (1928–2016), Honduran Roman Catholic bishop
 Justin Caporale, Director of Operation, Event Strategies, Inc.
 Mariano Caporale (born 1985), Argentine football player

See also
 Caporales, traditional dance in Bolivia